

Group A

Brazil
The squad chosen for the 2019 Pan American Games in Lima, Peru.

Head coach: Jorge Dueñas

Canada
The squad chosen for the 2019 Pan American Games in Lima, Peru.

Head coach: Nathalie Brochu

Cuba
The squad chosen for the 2019 Pan American Games in Lima, Peru.

Head coach: Jorge Coll

Puerto Rico
The squad chosen for the 2019 Pan American Games in Lima, Peru.

Head coach: Dennis Santiago

Group B

Argentina
The squad chosen for the 2019 Pan American Games in Lima, Peru.

Head coach: Eduardo Gallardo

Dominican Republic
The squad chosen for the 2019 Pan American Games in Lima, Peru.

Head coach: Felix Romero

Peru
The squad chosen for the 2019 Pan American Games in Lima, Peru.

Head coach: Mario Ramos

United States
The squad chosen for the 2019 Pan American Games in Lima, Peru.

Head coach: Christian Latulippe

References

Women's team rosters
Pan American Games handball squads